Jesse Beryle Hahn (October 29, 1921June 29, 1998) was an American-French character actor who mostly starred in French films.

Biography

After serving with the Marines in the Second World War, he moved to France in 1949 and took French citizenship.

Firstly a musician, he became an actor and starred in film noirs and westerns. A large man, Hahn often appeared in "strong man" roles, such as in Cartouche and Topkapi. Seen mostly as a character actor in French films, he played a rare leading role in Éric Rohmer's The Sign of Leo. Hahn was employed by French movie-maker Jean-Marie Pallardy, becoming one of his recurrent actors, until his retirement. 
Hahn died at age 76 in Saint-Malo, France.

Selected filmography

 Deux de l'escadrille (1953)
 La môme vert-de-gris (1953) - Le marin-geôlier
 The Most Wanted Man (1953) - Walter le Vicieux, un truand
 Act of Love (1953) - Un soldat (uncredited)
 The Pirates of the Bois de Boulogne (1954) - Le marin américain
 Father Brown - Minor Role (uncredited)
 Ça va barder (1955) - Un Marin Américain au 'Paradise' (uncredited)
 L'impossible Monsieur Pipelet (1955) - Jerome K. Smith, l'américain
 Girl on the Third Floor (1955) - L'Américain (uncredited)
 Tant qu'il y aura des femmes (1955)
 Madelon (1955) - Le général américain Gibson
 Les Hussards (1955) - Un hussard (uncredited)
 The Best Part (1955) - Karl - un mineur
 Meeting in Paris (1956) - Henry
 Ces sacrées vacances (1956) - Richard Brown - l'Américain
 Fernand cow-boy (1956) - Jim Harlan, Saloon manager
 The Lebanese Mission (1956) - Le valet
 The Happy Road (1957) - MP Sgt. Morgan
 Le colonel est de la revue (1957) - Jess
 Action immédiate (1957) - Kalpannen
 The Vintage (1957) - André Morel (uncredited)
 Let's Be Daring, Madame (1957) - Edward Butterfield dit 'Eddy'
 Send a Woman When the Devil Fails (1957) - La Couture
 Le triporteur (1957) - Daniel (uncredited)
 Nathalie (1957) - Sam
 Le désert de Pigalle (1958) - Bill
 Chéri, fais-moi peur (1958) - Chris Craft, L'espion américain
 Le Sicilien (1958) - Raffles
 Time Bomb (1959) - Le marin blessé
 The Tiger Attacks (1959) - Donald
 La femme et le Pantin (1959) - Sidney
 Le Sahara brûle (1961) - Jeff Gordon
 The Big Gamble (1961) - First Mate
 Dynamite Jack (1961) - Sergeant Bob
 Cartouche (1962) - La Douceur
 The Sign of Leo (1962) - Pierre Wesselrin
 Mon oncle du Texas (1962) - Brad
 Mandrin (1962) - Bertrand le braco
 The Trial (1962) - Second Assistant Inspector
 Une blonde comme ça (1963) - Sam
 People in Luck (1963) - Un chauffeur de taxi (segment "Le repas gastronomique") (uncredited)
 Verspätung in Marienborn (1963) - Sgt. Torre
 Que personne ne sorte (1964) - Bugsy Weis
 Topkapi (1964) - Hans Fisher
 The Great Spy Chase (1964) - Le Commodore O'Brien
 The Gorillas (1964) - Boris, Alexis Alexevitch, le maquilleur
 Cent briques et des tuiles (1965) - Palmoni
 What's New Pussycat? (1965) - Mr. Werner
 The Wise Guys (1965) - Nénesse
 Up to His Ears (1965) - Cornelius Ponchabert
 Secret Agent Super Dragon (1966) - Baby Face
 The Mona Lisa Has Been Stolen (1966) - Fêtard, le milliardaire noctambule
 Le facteur s'en va-t-en guerre (1966) - Jess Parker
 Le Saint prend l'affût (1966) - Hoppy Uniatz
 Triple Cross (1966) - Commander Braid
 L'homme qui valait des milliards (1967) - Henry
 The Crazy Kids of the War (1967) - Maj. Bill Hocks
 Your Turn to Die (1967) - Boris
 Le démoniaque (1968) - Floyd Delaney
 The Fuller Report (1968) - Eddy Bennet
 The Night of the Following Day (1969) - Friendly
 L'ardoise (1970) - Bob Daniels
 Atlantic Wall (1970) - Le colonel anglais
 Les Novices (1970) - L'Américain
 Laisse aller... c'est une valse (1971) - Congo
 Captain Apache (1971) - Father Rodriguez (uncredited)
 Boulevard du Rhum (1971) - Piet aka "Big Dutch"
 Bad Man's River (1971) - Tom Odie
 L'ingénu (1972) - Le capitaine
 Decameron proibitissimo (Boccaccio mio statte zitto) (1972) - Prior (uncredited)
 The Sicilian Connection (1972) - Sacha
 The Grand Duel (1972) - Bighorse the Stagecoach Driver
 La isla misteriosa y el capitán Nemo (1973) - Bonaventure Pencroft
 Mean Frank and Crazy Tony (1973) - Jeannot
 Three Tough Guys (1974) - The Bartender
 Un linceul n'a pas de poches (1974) - Walter
 The Man from Chicago (1975) - Jeff
 Jackpot (1975)
 Le point de mire (1977) - Général Harris
  (1977) - Manager
 State Reasons (1978) - agent de la CIA
 Mama Dracula (1980) - Le commissaire
 Teheran 43 (1981) - Second Terrorist
 Par où t'es rentré? On t'a pas vu sortir (1984) - Mac Douglas
 Vivre pour survivre (1985) - Sam
 La galette du roi (1986) - Morrisson - un réalisateur TV
 Overdose (1987) - The Doctor

References

External links
 

1921 births
1998 deaths
American emigrants to France
American male film actors
French male film actors
Actors from Terre Haute, Indiana
20th-century American male actors
United States Marine Corps personnel of World War II
20th-century French male actors
Male actors from Indiana
Male Western (genre) film actors
United States Marines